Fellenberg may refer to:
Alfred Fellenberg Conard
Philipp Emanuel von Fellenberg